Worldwide 50 Gold Award Hits Vol. 1 is a compilation box set by American singer and musician Elvis Presley. The four-album set was released in August, 1970, as his 38th album. The set peaked at number 45 on the Billboard 200 and at number 25 on the country chart.  It was certified Gold on February 13, 1973, Platinum on March 27, 1992, and 2× Platinum on June 17, 1992, by the Recording Industry Association of America. Of the 51 tracks featured, four make their album debut in this collection: "Viva Las Vegas",   "Suspicious Minds", "Don't Cry Daddy", and "Kentucky Rain".

All tracks in this box set are in mono

Track listing

Charts

Certifications

References

External links
Worldwide 50 Gold Award Hits Vol. 1 - Sergent.com.au

Elvis Presley compilation albums
1970 greatest hits albums
RCA Records compilation albums